Zarya, also known as the Functional Cargo Block or FGB (from the  or ФГБ), is the first module of the International Space Station to have been launched.  The FGB provided electrical power, storage, propulsion, and guidance to the ISS during the initial stage of assembly.  With the launch and assembly in orbit of other modules with more specialized functionality,  it is primarily used for storage, both inside the pressurized section and in the externally mounted fuel tanks. The Zarya is a descendant of the TKS spacecraft designed for the Russian Salyut program. The name Zarya ("Dawn") was given to the FGB because it signified the dawn of a new era of international cooperation in space. Although it was built by a Russian company, it is owned by the United States.

Construction 
The FGB design was originally intended as a module for the Russian Mir space station, but was not flown as of the end of the Mir program.  A FGB cargo block was incorporated as an upper stage engine into the Polyus spacecraft, flown (unsuccessfully) on the first Energia launch.  With the end of the Mir program, the design was adapted to use for the International Space Station.

The Zarya module is capable of station keeping and provides sizable battery power; it was suggested to have initially been built to both power and control the recoil from a further derivation of the then classified Skif laser system/Polyus satellite. Commentators in the West thought that the Zarya module was constructed cheaper and lifted to orbit faster than should have been possible in the post-Soviet era, and that the FGB might have been largely constructed from mothballed hardware from the Skif laser program (which had been canceled after the failed 1987 Polyus launch).

The research and development of a similar design was paid for by Russia and the Soviet Union, the design of the module and all systems are Soviet/Russian. The United States funded Zarya through the U.S. prime contracts in the 1990s as the first module for ISS. Built from December 1994 to January 1998 in Russia at the Khrunichev State Research and Production Space Center (KhSC) in Moscow.  The module was included as part of NASA's plan for the International Space Station (ISS) instead of Lockheed Martin's "Bus-1" option because it was significantly cheaper (US$220 million vs. $450 million). As part of the contract, Khrunichev constructed much of an identical module (referred to as "FGB-2") for contingency purposes. FGB-2 was proposed to be used for a variety of projects; it has been used to construct the Russian Multipurpose Laboratory Module Nauka.

Design 

The module has three docking ports: one axially on the front end at the docking sphere, one on the Earth-facing side (nadir) of the docking sphere and one axially on the aft end.
Attached to the forward port is the Pressurized Mating Adapter PMA-1, which in turn is connected to the Unity Module – this is the connection
between the Russian Orbital Segment (ROS) and the US Orbital Segment (USOS).
Attached to the aft port is the Zvezda Service Module. The lower port (nadir) was initially used by visiting Soyuz spacecraft and Progress spacecraft to dock to the ROS; The Rassvet module is now docked semipermanently on the nadir port of Zarya, and visiting spacecraft use Rassvet nadir docking port instead. It was planned to install another zenith docking port in the docking sphere, however, after the design was changed, a spherical cover was welded in its place.

They are still generating some power, but not the average  of power, they once provided when they were fully unfurled. Zarya also has 24 large steering jets, 12 small steering jets, and two large engines that were used for reboost and major orbital changes; with the docking of Zvezda these are now permanently disabled. Since they are no longer needed for Zarya engines, Zarya's propellant tanks are now used to store additional fuel for Zvezda.

Launch and flight 

After Zarya reached orbit, STS-88 launched on 4 December 1998 to attach the Unity module.

Although only designed to fly autonomously for six to eight months, Zarya was required to do so for almost two years due to delays to the Russian Service Module, Zvezda. Zvezda was finally launched on 12 July 2000, docking with Zarya on 26 July 2000.

Zarya passed the 50,000-orbit mark at 15:17 UTC on 14 August 2007 during the STS-118 mission to the International Space Station.

Dockings 
Nadir

Rassvet, 2010–Present
Forward
Unity (via PMA-1), 1998–Present
Aft
Zvezda, 2000–Present

Gallery

Notes

References

See also

 Power and Propulsion Element station module of the Lunar Gateway

1998 in Russia
Russian components of the International Space Station
Spacecraft launched in 1998
Spacecraft launched by Proton rockets